Sue Walker may refer to:

Sue Walker (politician) (born 1951), British-Australian politician
Sue Walker (rower) (born 1967), British rower
Sue Brannan Walker (born 1940), American poet

Fictional characters
Sue Walker, a fictional character on the television series In the Flesh

See also
Susan Walker (disambiguation)